Black Listed is a 2003 crime drama film directed by, and starring, Robert Townsend.

Premise
Lawyer Alan Chambers (Robert Townsend) grows tired of watching criminals being released and takes it upon himself to create a list of criminals he feels should be put to death. He sends it to his closest friends, only to find later that the killing has already begun without his involvement.

Cast
Robert Townsend as Alan Chambers
Harry Lennix as Karl Bennett
Vanessa Estelle Williams as J.W.
Calvin Levels as Trouble Truman
Eugene Lee as Derrick Cox
Dick Anthony Williams as Missouri
John Dennis Johnston as Lt. Rayson
Keith Amos as Kushon Barnes
Richard Lawson as Agent Gordon
Victoria Rowell as Patricia Chambers
Kore'n Anderson as Speed
Derrick Jones as Jail House
Bobby McGee as Officer Gaby
Gary Clancy as Officer Shamrock
Angelle Brooks as Marcella

External links

2003 films
Films directed by Robert Townsend
2003 crime drama films
American crime drama films
Hood films
American vigilante films
2000s English-language films
2000s American films